The New Order (NOR) was a far-right revolutionary nationalist political party in Venezuela. It was founded as a national party on January 12, 1974, by Felix Díaz Ortega.

History

Its national headquarters was located in Schaffer Street in the Buena Vista Sector of Petare, Caracas, where it participated in multiple social and humanitarian projects among the population, especially the elderly diabetics. The party had a presence in more than 15 states, and its strongest bastions were Miranda, Falcon, Carabobo, and Lara.

It participated in several national and regional electoral elections. In 1992, the party obtained enough votes to access the newly created municipality of Chacao in Caracas, but their rights were denied by the then current government. NOR militant bases were varied, from nostalgic followers or former president Marcos Pérez Jiménez, supporters of the New Right, and national socialist. In 1995 when the French politician and National Front leader, Jean-Marie Le Pen, went on to become the third political force in the country, New Order strengthened ties with the French National Front. In the 1993 Venezuelan presidential election the party postulated and supported their leader, Félix Díaz Ortega, as a presidential candidate.

In 2001 NOR pickets paraded alongside other opposition political forces in a massive march in Caracas, carrying signs that read Out with Communism in the barracks. The party ceased their operations and dissolved their existence in 2002.

Aims
The party's ambitions were summarized in 25 points of action aimed at developing a hypothetical government:

 Increased participation in all levels of government.
 Implementation of the Federal system.
 Country's return to the borders of 1811.
 Apply an agrarian reform, to make Venezuela an agricultural powerhouse.
 Progressive Savings nonrenewable natural resources and rational use of national resources.
 National Housing Plan, pretending away the housing crisis in a span of 20 years.
 Free and compulsory education for all under 18.
 Public Administration Reform under criterion: Austerity in the management and investment liberality.
 Reorientation of the national economy in the interests of the majority. Enforce social function to private and public capital.
 Demographic territorial reorganization and rationalization of immigration.
 Implementation of a Social Security System that protects the individual before birth and even after death.
 Amendment to the Constitution of 1961, in terms of economic rights.
 Mandatory Military Service.
 Election by competition in all branches of the judiciary, to avoid layoffs for political reasons or unjustified.
 Creation of the National Police and regional police forces.
 Pass a comprehensive defense bill Homeland.
 Independent foreign policy against the interests of other countries.
 Elimination of monopolies and oligopolies official or private.
 Ensuring absolute freedom of speech, trade, profession and industry no limitations other than the common good.
 National policy on public transport with private participation, users and regional and national government.
 Construction of a railway network of 50,000 km.
 Mandatory work or study for anyone aged 16 years and under 60 years.
 Progressive elimination of privileges and official reliefs of some sectors of the country.
 Establishment of multidimensional democratic system, capable of providing political democracy, social and economic the country.

References

Defunct political parties in Venezuela
Far-right political parties in Venezuela
Political parties established in 1974
Political parties disestablished in 2002
Anti-communism in Venezuela